Rahim Uddin Bharosha (1934-2020) was a former Bangladesh Nationalist Party politician and the former Member of Parliament of Extinct Rangpur-10 (now Rangpur-4) seat.

Birth and early life 
Rahim Uddin was born in the house of late Moner Uddin Paiker and Mosammat Nabijan Nesa in Rangpur District in 1934.

Career 
Bharosha was elected to parliament from Rangpur-4 as a Jatiya Party candidate in 1979.

Death 
Rahim Uddin Bharosha died on 11 March 2020.

See also 

 1979 Bangladeshi general election

References

External links 

 List of 2nd Parliament Members -Jatiya Sangsad (In Bangla)

1934 births
2020 deaths
People from Rangpur District
Bangladesh Nationalist Party politicians
2nd Jatiya Sangsad members
Bangladeshi businesspeople